Bonitus of Monte Cassino (died c. 584) was a Benedictine monk and abbot of the monastery of Monte Cassino. During his abbacy the monastery was plundered by the Lombards under Zotto of Benevento and Bonitus fled with his monks to the Lateran Hill in Rome, dying shortly afterwards.

External links
https://web.archive.org/web/20120222044521/http://www.saintpatrickdc.org/ss/0707.shtml

584 deaths
Italian Benedictines
Italian abbots
Benedictine abbots
Year of birth unknown
6th-century Italo-Roman people